Harry Byrne (born 22 April 1999) is an Irish rugby union player who is currently a member of the Leinster academy. He plays as a fly-half and represents Lansdowne in the All-Ireland League.

Leinster
Whilst still in Leinster's academy, Byrne was selected in the provinces pre-season squad, and he went on to score 17 points in their 47–17 win against Coventry, as well as featuring in the 38–35 win against Canada. Following his pre-season performances, Byrne was selected on the bench for Leinster's opening 2019–20 Pro14 fixture away to Italian side Benetton on 28 September 2019, and he replaced older brother Ross in the 69th minute, scoring a late penalty to secure a 32–27 win for Leinster.

Ireland
In June 2021 he was called up to the senior Ireland squad for the Summer tests. Byrne scored six points in his debut off the bench for the Ireland senior side, in a 71–10 victory over the United States on 10 July 2021.

References

External links
Leinster Academy Profile
Ireland U20 Profile
Pro14 Profile

1999 births
Living people
People educated at St Michael's College, Dublin
Irish rugby union players
Lansdowne Football Club players
Leinster Rugby players
Rugby union fly-halves
Ireland international rugby union players
Rugby union players from Dublin (city)